Maximus Mighty-Dog Mueller II (May 6, 2013 – July 30, 2022) was a golden retriever dog that served as the second mayor of Idyllwild–Pine Cove, California.  His deputy mayors, Mitzi and Mikey, were his cousins. The town is known for being one of the first to elect a dog for mayor.

As Idyllwild is an unincorporated town, it has no local government. In 2012, as a fundraiser envisioned by, held by, and for the benefit of local animal rescue non-profit organization Idyllwild Animal Rescue Friends (ARF), town locals held an election for which locals could nominate their dogs and cats to run for Mayor. Fourteen dogs and two cats ran, and Max, a Golden Retriever, was elected as its first mayor. In 2013, Mayor Max died, and Maximus Mighty Dog Mueller II, another Golden Retriever, arrived in Idyllwild to complete the remainder of the term. In March 2014, as the end of Max's term approached, ARF solicited the town's interest in holding another election. The people overwhelmingly pled for Mayor Max's continuation in perpetuity.

The Mayor's duties included visiting with locals and out-of-town visitors, attending business grand openings and other town functions, being in the town's two annual parades, and promoting Idyllwild. Max's popularity had spread the world over. He appeared on news programs, talk shows, advertisements, billboards, and a game show in the interest of the town.

Mayor Max was recognized by the County of Riverside, California.

Death

Mayor Max died in the city of Temecula on July 30, 2022, after suffering a brief medical issue. He was succeeded in office by Mayor Max III, who formally took office on December 10th, 2022.

See also
 List of individual dogs

References

External links
Official website

Individual dogs in politics
Individual dogs in the United States
2013 animal births
2022 animal deaths
Mayors of places in California